Lilesville Township, population 3,366, is one of eight townships in Anson County, North Carolina,  United States. Lilesville Township contains the town of Lilesville.

Geography
Lilesville Township is drained by the Pee Dee River and its tributaries on the north and east side.  These tributaries include Little Creek, Island Creek, McCoy Creek, Smith Creek, Buffalo Creek, Jenkins Branch, Reeder Branch, Savannah Creek, Turkey Top Creek, and Cedar Creek.  Jones Creek forms the southern boundary and it has a tributary, Hale Creek.  Cedar Creek forms the northwestern border and Bailey Creek forms the southwestern border.

References

Townships in Anson County, North Carolina
Townships in North Carolina